Hellgate Canyon is a canyon in Missoula County, Montana, formed by the Clark Fork River. It is located just to the east of Missoula, and is approximately fifty miles long. The entrance to the canyon is known as Hell's Gate.

Name
Hellgate Canyon's name is a reference to an ambush that occurred there, in which the Flathead Indians were defeated by the Blackfeet. The evidence of these ambushes was known as the "gates of hell", which led to the canyon acquiring its current name.

Historical significance
Hellgate Canyon contains some ancient pictographs estimated to be about 5,000 years old.

Lewis and Clark passed through Hellgate Canyon during their expedition through the Western United States. Later in the 19th century, Carrie Strahorn, also an explorer, wrote about a stagecoach ride she took in the area in 1878. She described, among other things, a "veritable Lover’s Lane" formed above the canyon by an arch of wild roses.

During the mid-19th century, as Montana was further colonized, the canyon became a major strategic corridor in the region, and the Mullan Road was routed through it. The Northern Pacific Railroad and Milwaukee Railroad were later routed along a similar path. 

French-Canadian settlers in Montana thought that the local Native Americans, especially those of the Flathead Nation, traveled through Hellgate Canyon to hunt for bison.

See also
Hellgate High School in Missoula, which is named after the canyon
H is for Hellgate, a band also named after the canyon

References

Canyons and gorges of Montana
Geography of Missoula County, Montana